José Ricardo Rodrigues (born 5 April 1974) is a Brazilian boxer. He competed in the men's middleweight event at the 1996 Summer Olympics.

References

1974 births
Living people
Brazilian male boxers
Olympic boxers of Brazil
Boxers at the 1996 Summer Olympics
Sportspeople from São Paulo
Middleweight boxers